María Eugenia Sánchez Bravo (born 25 July 1969) is a Spanish team handball player who played for the club BM Femenino Elda and on the Spanish national team. She was born in Madrid. She competed at the 1992 Summer Olympics in Barcelona, where the Spanish team placed seventh.

References

1969 births
Living people
Sportspeople from Madrid
Spanish female handball players
Olympic handball players of Spain
Handball players at the 1992 Summer Olympics
Handball players at the 2004 Summer Olympics
Mediterranean Games gold medalists for Spain
Mediterranean Games medalists in handball
Competitors at the 2005 Mediterranean Games
Handball players from the Community of Madrid
21st-century Spanish women